Moreblessing Bwende (born 1 August 2001) is a Zimbabwean footballer who plays as a defender. She has been a member of the Zimbabwe women's national team.

Club career
Bwende has played for Harare City Queens FC in Zimbabwe.

International career
Bwende capped for Zimbabwe at senior level during the 2020 COSAFA Women's Championship.

References

2001 births
Living people
Zimbabwean women's footballers
Women's association football defenders
Zimbabwe women's international footballers